A78 or A-78 may refer to:

 A78 road (Scotland)
 Benoni Defense, in the Encyclopaedia of Chess Openings
 ARM Cortex-A78